Siempre Así is a Spanish pop group founded in Seville in 1991. The eight members of the group, including four singers, are Paola Prieto, Sandra Barón, Mati Carnerero, Rocío García Muñiz, Maite Parejo, Nacho Sabater, Ángel Rivas, and Rafa Almarcha.

Discography 
 Siempre así, 1992
 Mahareta, 1994
 Cantando que es gerundio, 1997
 Diez y cuarto, 1998
 Todo vale, 2000
 Diez años juntos, 2001
 Nuevas canciones para padres novatos, 2000
 Km 8, 2004
 Vamo a escuchá grandes éxitos, 2006
 La misa de la alegría, 2006
 El amor es otra cosa, 2009
 El sentido de la navidad, 2011
 20 Años 2012
 Corazón 2015

References

External links
Website

Spanish musical groups